Eastmain River Airport , is located  southwest of Eastmain, Quebec, Canada.

Airlines and destinations

References

External links
Page about this airport on COPA's Places to Fly airport directory

Eeyou Istchee (territory)
Certified airports in Nord-du-Québec